An exciter (also called a harmonic exciter or aural exciter) is an audio signal processing technique used to enhance a signal by dynamic equalization, phase manipulation, harmonic synthesis of (usually) high frequency signals, and through the addition of subtle harmonic distortion. Dynamic equalization involves variation of the equalizer characteristics in the time domain as a function of the input. Due to the varying nature, noise is reduced compared to static equalizers. Harmonic synthesis involves the creation of higher order harmonics from the fundamental frequency signals present in the recording. As noise is usually more prevalent at higher frequencies, the harmonics are derived from a purer frequency band resulting in clearer highs. Exciters are also used to synthesize harmonics of low frequency signals to simulate deep bass in smaller speakers.

Originally made in valve (tube) based equipment, they are now implemented as part of a digital signal processor, often trying to emulate analogue exciters.  Exciters are mostly found as plug-ins for sound editing software and in sound enhancement processors.

Aphex aural exciter
The Aphex aural exciter was one of the first exciter effects. The effect was developed in the mid-1970s by Aphex Electronics. The aural exciter adds phase shift and musically related synthesized harmonics to audio signals. The first Aural Exciter units were available in the mid-1970s, exclusively on the rental basis of $30 per minute of finished recorded time. In the 1970s, certain recording artists, including Anne Murray, Neil Diamond, Jackson Browne, The Four Seasons, Olivia Newton-John, Linda Ronstadt and James Taylor stated in their liner notes "This album was recorded using the Aphex Aural Exciter."

Aphex started selling the professional units, and introduced two low-cost models: Type B and Type C. The Aural Exciter circuit is now licensed by a growing list of manufacturers, including Yamaha, MacKenzie, Gentner, E-mu Systems and Bogen. The original Aphex Aural Exciter, first offered in 1975, came without the Big Bottom circuit, which was added in 1992. Later revisions of the Aphex Aural Exciter included the Model 104 Type C and Type C2 units. Aphex released in 2001 the Model 204 Aural Exciter and Optical Big Bottom, yet another refinement of the original unit. According to Aphex, the Model 204 updates the Aural Exciter and Big Bottom processor blocks with improved circuitry, including an optical gain-control element for the Big Bottom compressor.

Other brands
Functionally similar units from competing manufacturers are generically known either as "psychoacoustic processors", "psychoacoustic exciters", "harmonic exciters", or "enhancers". In the 1990s and 2000s, broadly comparable products became available from BBE, Joemeek, SPL and Behringer. Most are analogue signal processors, although a few digital units began to appear in the 2000s. The BBE Sonic Maximiser uses a similar process of frequency-dependent phase shifting, as do other brands to a varying extent.

Uses
Making vocals sound more "breathy". This is why the original product was called an Aural Exciter.
Enhancing dull recordings, especially analog reel-to-reel tape recordings that have lost their "sparkle" due to repeated overdubs.
Restoring old recordings by simulating lost spectral content.
As an audio enhancement for hardware and software media players.
Exciters are sometimes sold in a "stompbox" pedal format, in units designed for use with an electric guitar, electric bass, or electronic keyboards.

See also
Spectral band replication

References

External links
Enhancers article on Sound on Sound
Enhancers FAQ on Sound on Sound
Aphex Vintage Aural Exciter Plugin by Waves Audio

Audio effects